Paradise Valley is a village in central Alberta, Canada.

The economic base of the village is largely agricultural. Nearby hog operations and the Co-Op seed cleaning plant also contribute to local production.

History 
Paradise Valley has a long and rich agricultural history. The town was once host to six grain elevators along the rail line. Now, only one still stands, having been converted to the Climb Thru Time Museum. The project was spearheaded by Parke Dobson and Don Purser, as well as numerous others in the community.

The first school in the town was opened in 1930.

Climate

Demographics 

In the 2016 Census of Population conducted by Statistics Canada, the Village of Paradise Valley recorded a population of 179 living in 73 of its 76 total private dwellings, a  change from its 2011 population of 174.

Facilities 
There are several churches and a K-12 school, the E.H. Walter School, part of the Buffalo Trail Public Schools Regional Division No. 28 in Paradise Valley. There is a public arena and curling rink on the north side of town that also houses a cafe.

The village office, post office, firehall and village shop are all located downtown. The Agricultural Society Hall and Alberta Treasury Branch can also be found downtown.

Paradise Valley is home to a café and Climb Thru Time Museum run by the Paradise Valley Historical Society.

Events 
Paradise Valley is the home of the Three Cities Arena, the site of the Three Cities Park and the site of the annual Three Cities Fair.  Three Cities refers to Paradise Valley and the nearby hamlets of McLaughlin and Rivercourse.

See also 
List of communities in Alberta
List of villages in Alberta

References

External links 

1964 establishments in Alberta
Villages in Alberta